Girls night, or sometimes known as ladies night, is a female-only social gathering, which can be hosted by a female hostess to other female attendants, or that can happen at a public place without a hostess. Many different motivations for girls night exist, and can change drastically from person to person.

Variations
Closely related, female-only murder mystery events also do exist.

See also
Female bonding
Womance

References

Generalized sources
15 Secrets We Will Never Reveal About Girls Night Out
A Girls' Night Out Guide to Only Women-Owned Businesses
Girls Night Party Games

Specific references

Women and psychology
Gatherings of women
Human behavior